is a Japanese actress, voice actress and western astrologer. She sang the theme songs in productions such as Story of the Alps: My Annette and Kazoku Robinson Hyōryūki Fushigi na Shima no Furōne. Han is a fortune teller of western horoscopes. She wrote books on the subject. She is employed by talent agency Never Land Arts, and was previously affiliated with Aoni Production & 81 Produce.

She is most known for the roles of Lalah Sune (Mobile Suit Gundam), Saori Kido (Saint Seiya), Yurika Sugadaira (Goldfish Warning!) and Luna and Queen Beryl (Sailor Moon).

Keiko's daughter, Megumi Han is also a voice actress.

Early life
She was born in Tokyo. She graduated from Toyo Eiwa Jogakuin University and Nihon University College of Arts and Future Theater. Han is the daughter of Taiwanese parents. Early in her career, Han performed with Kenji Utsumi's troupe. She was invited by Utsumi and Michiko Nomura to work as a voice actress for film and television.

Career 
At the time of the appearance of Mobile Suit Gundam, she saw eight Broadway performances during a week-long stay in New York, which had a great impact on her voice acting. Kenji Utsumi and Ryōko Kinomiya are called parenting parents.

As a voice actress, she worked as a singer and on theme songs, especially known as "the World Masterpiece Theater" series. In this series, she, Eiko Yamada and Mitsuko Horie are recurring voice actresses. She appeared in quiz shows and TV dramas. In the early 1980s, female voice actors frequently won first place in popularity polls.

She worked as a western astrologer and authored many books. She serialized the horoscope section in Animage under the pseudonym Ban Kyoran. Currently, the astrology section (Lalah's Astrology Fortune Telling) is published in the Gundam Ace magazine, and in the anime, she is responsible for the fortune telling of Katekyō Hitman Reborn!. She began her fortune-telling when she became interested in the story of astrologer Tomoaki Nagare, whom she had met before, and began to study it. Less than a year after joining the disciple, she commenced writing a book with him.

Filmography

Television animation

1977 

Chojin Sentai Barattack (Yuri)
Angie Girl (Angie Airinton)

1979 

Mobile Suit Gundam (Lalah Sune, Icelina Eschonbach)
Entaku no Kishi Monogatari: Moero Arthur (Lady Guinevere)
Mirai Robo Daltanious (Sanae Shiratori)

1980 

The Adventures of Tom Sawyer (Becky Thatcher)
Ganbare Genki (Tomoko Ishida)
Invincible Robo Trider G7 (Ikue Sunabara)

1981 

Queen Millennia (Yayoi Yukino)
Dr. Slump Arale-chan (Drampire)

1982 

Kikou Kantai Dairugger XV (Patty Ellington)

1983 

Eagle Sam (Canary Carina)

1984 

Video Senshi Laserion (Olivia Lawrence)

1985 

Dancouga – Super Beast Machine God (Annette Hauser)
Sazae-san (Mitsuo Hama)

1986 

Saint Seiya (Athena, Saori)

1987 

Ai no Wakakusa Monogatari (Margaret "Meg" March)
City Hunter (Atsuko Kawada, Ep.12)

1988 

Anpanman (Ramen Tenshi, Oshiruko-chan, Shabondaman, misc. voices.)

1989 

Parasol Henbe (Kawai)

1991 

Goldfish Warning! (Yurika Sugadaira)
Mischievous Twins: The Tales of St. Clare's (Winnifred)

1992 

Pretty Soldier Sailor Moon (Luna and Queen Beryl)

1993 

Pretty Soldier Sailor Moon R (Luna)

1994 

Pretty Soldier Sailor Moon S (Luna)

1995 

Pretty Soldier Sailor Moon SuperS (Luna)
Bonobono (Araiguma-kun's mother)

1996 

Detective Conan (Megumi)
Pretty Soldier Sailor Moon Stars (Luna)

1999 

Pocket Monsters: Episode Orange Archipelago (Dr. Uchikido)

2000 

Mushrambo (Rusephine)

2002 

Mirmo! (Chirumu)

2005 

Air (Yamomo priestess)
Fushigiboshi no Futagohime (Moon Maria)

2011 

Hunter × Hunter (Mito Freecss)

2014 

The World is Still Beautiful (Sheila)Space Dandy (Pup, Ep.8)

 2019 Cautious Hero: The Hero Is Overpowered but Overly Cautious (Ishista)

 2021 One Piece (Toki Kōzuki)

Unknown dateGalaxy Express 999 (Boshin Yuki)Koguma no Mīsha (Natasha)Maetel Legend (Queen Promethium)Sgt. Frog (Keroro Boss, Kappa)Space Battleship Yamato III (Ruda Sharubāto)Story of the Alps: My Annette (Annette)Ultraman Kids no Kotowaza Monogatari (Piko)Video Senshi Resarion (Olivia)Wakakusa Monogatari Yori Wakakusa no Yon Shimai (Elizabeth March (Beth)

Original video animations (OVAs)Prefectural Earth Defense Force (1986) (Miyuki Ōyama)Legend of the Galactic Heroes (1988) (Annerose von Grünewald)Teito Monogatari (1991) (Yukari Tatsumiya)Saint Seiya series (2002) (Athena, Saori)Mobile Suit Gundam Unicorn: Episode 7: Over the Rainbow (2014) (Lalah Sune)

FilmsBe Forever Yamato (1980) (Sasha)Uchu Senshi Baldios (1981) (Jimmy Hoshino)Mobile Suit Gundam III: Encounters in Space (1982) (Lalah Sune)Harmageddon (1983) (Junko Sawakawa) Locke the Superman (1984) (Jessica)Doraemon: Nobita's Little Star Wars (1985) (Papi)The Legend of the Gold of Babylon (1985) (Jinjao)Mobile Suit Gundam: Char's Counterattack (1988) (Lalah Sune)Legend of the Galactic Heroes: Overture to a New Year (1993) (Annerose von Grunewald)Pretty Soldier Sailor Moon R The Movie (1993) (Luna)Pretty Soldier Sailor Moon S The Movie (1994) (Luna)The 9 Sailor Soldiers Get Together! Miracle in the Black Dream Hole! (1995) (Luna)Pocket Monsters the Movie - Mirage Pokémon: Lugia's Explosive Birth (1999) (Dr. Uchikido)Doraemon: Nobita in the Wan-Nyan Spacetime Odyssey (2004) (Hachi's Mother)Air (2005) (Yamano priestess)

Video gamesDouble Dragon (1995) (Rebecca Brielle)Granblue Fantasy (Robomi)Langrisser I & II - Der Langrisser (xxxx) (Jessica)Marvel: Ultimate Alliance (xxxx) (Jessica Drew/Spider-Woman)Marvel: Ultimate Alliance 2 (xxxx) (Jessica Drew/Spider-Woman)Next King: Ai no Sennen Ōkoku (xxxx) (Marein Furakkusu)Project Justice (xxxx) (Yurika Kirishima)Saint Seiya series (xxxx-) (Athena, Saori)Tengai Makyou II: Manjimaru (xxxx) (Princess Hamaguri, Jakōin Matsumushi)Tenkajin (xxxx) (Kichō)World of Final Fantasy (2016) (Plumed Knight, Lusse)

Dubbing roles

Live-action
Airwolf (season 4) (Jo Santini (Michele Scarabelli))
The Blue Lagoon (1983 TBS edition) (Emmeline Lestrange (Brooke Shields))
The Cannonball Run (1987 TV Asashi edition) (Marcie (Adrienne Barbeau))
Carrie (1976) (1980 TBS edition) (Carrie White (Sissy Spacek))
Carrie (2013) (Margaret White (Julianne Moore))
Casablanca (New Era Movies edition) (Ilsa Lund (Ingrid Bergman))
Castle Rock (Ruth Deaver (Sissy Spacek))
Dallas (Lucy Ewing Cooper (Charlene Tilton))
ER (season 3-10) (Nurse Connie Oligario (Conni Marie Brazelton))
Knight Rider (April Curtis (Rebecca Holden))
La Boum 2 (Vic Beretton (Sophie Marceau))
Where the Heart Is (Thelma "Sister" Husband (Stockard Channing))
White Men Can't Jump (Gloria Clemente (Rosie Perez))

Other voice over work
Moero!! Robokon (1999) (Robopī)
Pretty Guardian Sailor Moon (2003) (Luna, cat-form)
Mahou Sentai Magiranger (2005) (Heavenly Saint Snowgel)
Juken Sentai Gekiranger (2007) (Genju Pixie-Fist Hiso)

CD
Crest of the Royal Family - Part. 1 (Carol)
Star Wars Story (Leia Organa)
CD Theater DragonQuest series (I-III Rubisu, IV Rosary)
Kishiwada-hakase no Kagakuteki Aijou (Miss Mellon)

Books

Photo books
Han Keiko
Han Tastic
Who Saw the Wind?
Tangram

Other works
 (PR video)

References

External links
 Official agency profile 
 Keiko Han at GamePlaza-Haruka Voice Acting Database 
 Keiko Han at Hitoshi Doi's Seiyuu Database
 
 

1953 births
Living people
Aoni Production voice actors
Japanese astrologers
Japanese people of Taiwanese descent
Japanese video game actresses
Japanese voice actresses
Nihon University alumni
People from Minato
Voice actresses from Tokyo
20th-century Japanese actresses
21st-century Japanese actresses
81 Produce voice actors